Scott Hylands Douglas (born 1943) is a Canadian actor who has appeared in movies, on television, and on the stage. Because of his longevity and versatility, critics have called him "one of Canada's greatest actors."

Early years
Hylands was born in 1943 in Vancouver, British Columbia. His mother Ruth was a science teacher, and his father Walter died during World War II. Hylands was raised and educated in Vancouver, where he attended  Shawnigan Lake Boys School; he then attended the University of British Columbia and graduated in 1964. Hylands at first studied zoology, but when the university began a theater arts major, he transferred into that program. Upon graduation, he left Canada to pursue an acting career in New York City, where his first role was as the lead in an off-Broadway production of the comedy Billy Liar.

Career in the United States
After that 1965 debut role, he spent several years in San Francisco, acting with the American Conservatory Theater.  Then, in 1968, he was asked by Hollywood director Mark Robson to audition for a movie role. His first movie appearance was in the 1969 suspense film Daddy's Gone A-Hunting. He got good reviews, but his movie debut was overshadowed by another film that came out at the same time: Midnight Cowboy.  

In August 1975 Hylands appeared onstage as Mercutio in the Los Angeles Free Shakespeare Society production of Romeo and Juliet at the Pilgrimage Theatre in the Cahuenga Pass. 

He won some critical praise, both for his acting skill and for his good looks. He was even compared to Paul Newman. And while he did not become famous, he worked regularly, appearing in a number of movies, as well as in some American television shows. Among the TV shows in which he acted were Cannon, The Waltons, Baretta, and Ironside. On American TV, he became well known for playing tough guy characters and villains: as he noted in an interview, if an actor is not the leading man, he generally plays a "heavy."

Career in Canada
In the early 1980s, Hylands returned to Canada, settling in Salt Spring Island, British Columbia. He also got an opportunity to play a good guy, the role of Detective Kevin "O.B." O'Brien on the television series Night Heat, Night Heat was a police drama, produced in Toronto; it aired on both Canadian (CTV) and American (CBS) TV, from 1985 to 1989.  This was his first starring role on any TV program.

After Night Heat was canceled, Hylands continued to live in Canada, with his wife Veronica, a nurse, and their two children; but he worked in both American and Canadian productions. He appeared as Father Travis in the ABC-TV series V. He was seen on numerous other programs, including the 1992 TV movie To Catch a Killer, a 1995 episode of the hit cop drama NYPD Blue, and on four episodes of the remade version of The Outer Limits from 1996-2001. He also returned to the Canadian stage, playing leading roles in such productions as Waiting for Godot (2015), and The Tempest (1994), among others. He produced and directed a 2008 version of Waiting for Godot, and performed in a solo version of A Christmas Carol. In addition, he directed, as well as performed in, a 2006 production of Under Milk Wood that was staged in Victoria BC. In his early 70s, he has expressed no interest in retiring, and continues to be involved with theater.

Partial filmography

 Daddy's Gone A-Hunting (1969) - Kenneth Daly
 Operation Snafu (1970) - Reginald Wollington
 Fools (1970) - David Appleton
 Earth II (1971, TV Movie) - Jim Capa
 The Sixth Sense (1972, TV Series) - Jason
 Griff (1973, TV Series) - Assassin
 Slipstream (1973) - Terry
 The Visitor (1974)
 The Magician (1974, TV Series) - Hal
 Earthquake (1974) - Asst. Caretaker - Hollywood Reservoir Dam
 Bittersweet Love (1976) - Michael Lewis
 Cannon (1976, TV series) - Joe Gantry
 Wonder Woman (1977, TV Series) - Paul Bjornsen
  Police Story (1977, TV Series) - Lt. Carl Inforzato
 The Boys in Company "C" (1978) - Capt. Collins
 The Winds of Kitty Hawk (1978) - Glenn Curtiss
 Coming Out Alive (1980) - Jocko
 Death Hunt (1981) - The Pilot
 Hart to Hart (1982, TV Series) - Alan Chambers
 Shocktrauma (1982, TV Movie) - Dr. "Tex" Goodnight
 George Washington (1984, TV Mini-Series) - General Greene
 Isaac Littlefeathers (1984) - Jesse Armstrong
 The Oasis (1984) - Jake
 Night Heat (1985–1989, TV series) - Detective Kevin O'Brien
 To Catch a Killer (1992, TV film) - Delta Squad Sergeant Mike Paxton 
 Ordeal in the Arctic (1993, TV Movie) - Fred Ritchie
 Destiny Ridge (1993, TV Series)
 Decoy (1996) - Jenner
 Titanic (1996) - John Jacob Astor IV
 Ignition (2001) - Carlsen
 Pursued (2004) - Robert Langford
 The Hamster Cage (2005) - Stan
 Anna's Storm (2007, TV Movie) - Clint Corbin
 Freezer Burn: The Invasion of Laxdale (2008) - Arnie Filmore
 V (2009, TV series) - Father Tarvis
 Beyond the Black Rainbow (2010) - Dr. Mercurio Arboria
 Knockout (2011) - Grandfather Charlie Putman
 Becoming Redwood (2012) - Earl
 Rememory (2017) - Charles
 Fargo (2017, TV Series) - Ennis Stussy

References

External links
 
 
 Scott Hylands(Aveleyman)

1943 births
Canadian male film actors
Canadian male television actors
Canadian people of Scottish descent
Living people
Male actors from Vancouver
Shawnigan Lake School alumni
University of British Columbia alumni